Swati Dhingra is an Associate Professor of Economics at the London School of Economics and an external member of the Bank of England's Monetary Policy Committee.

She earned her undergraduate degree from Delhi University, holds an MA from the Delhi School of Economics and obtained an MS and PhD in Economics from the University of Wisconsin–Madison.

She has been a prominent critic of Brexit.

References

Year of birth missing (living people)
Living people
Delhi University alumni
Delhi School of Economics alumni
University of Wisconsin–Madison alumni